WTHI-FM (99.9 MHz; "HI-99") is a radio station running a country music format in Terre Haute, Indiana.  The station's studios and broadcast tower are located along Ohio Street in downtown Terre Haute.  The station is owned by Midwest Communications.

WTHI-FM has led the Terre Haute market ratings for over twenty years.  In 2007, the station celebrated 25 years in the country format.
Over the years, WTHI has raised more than $1,000,000 for the kids at St. Jude Children's Research Hospital.

WTHI-FM's former studio building, which was shared with sister station WWVR and former sister station WTHI-TV (which was co-owned with WTHI-FM from 1954 to 2005), is being demolished in December 2012 to accommodate parking for a new office building constructed behind the former WTHI building and facing Wabash Avenue.  The old building was constructed as a garment factory in 1906, but housed WTHI-FM and WTHI-TV from 1954 to 2012.  WTHI-FM and WWVR, which were later joined by new acquisitions WFNF/1130 AM and WFNB/92.7 FM, moved into their new office building in August 2012; this separated the stations from WTHI-TV, which moved to its own new building (at 800 Ohio Street) in October 2012.

References

External links
 

THI
Country radio stations in the United States
Radio stations established in 1948
Midwest Communications radio stations